"Boľavé námestie" is the debut solo single by the female singer Marika Gombitová released on OPUS in 1977.

The composition was written by Lehotský and Brezovská, being issued on the various artists compilation OPUS '77. B-side of the single featured "Ty vieš, mama". Both songs were on CD released in 2000 as bonus tracks of the singer's debut album re-release Dievča do dažďa.

Official versions
 "Boľavé námestie" - Studio version, 1977

Credits and personnel
 Marika Gombitová - lead vocal
 Janko Lehotský - music
 V.Brezovská - lyrics
 OPUS - copyright

References

General

Specific

External links 
 

1977 songs
1977 debut singles
Marika Gombitová songs
Songs written by Ján Lehotský
Slovak-language songs